Renato Simoni (Verona, 5 September 1875 – Milan, 5 July 1952) was an Italian journalist, playwright, writer and theatrical critic noted for his collaboration work with Giuseppe Adami for Giacomo Puccini's Turandot.

Simoni's career was entirely devoted to theater.  His first job was as an editor and a critic at L'Adige, a local Veronese newspaper company in his hometown. In 1902, he wrote one of his best comedies, La Vedova, followed by Carlo Gozzi (1903), Tramondo (1906), Congedo (1910) and Il matrimonio di Casanova.

In 1914, he succeeded John Pozza as an author and critic at Corriere della Sera newspaper. He worked for the company until the end of his life. He also held a position as a director for a weekly magazine, La Tradotta.

All his writings and critics were collected in volumes by Lucio Ridenti in 1951 under the title Trent'anni di cronaca drammatica and was published in 1960.

In 1952, Simoni donated 40,000 volumes of his writings and reviews to the Museum of La Scala and dedicated them to his mother, Livia. The museum library was named Biblioteca Livia Simoni after his mother.

Simoni died in Milan in 1952 and is buried at the city's Monumental Cemetery.

References

External links
 Simoni short biography
 Livia Simoni Library
 One of Simoni’s collaboration work

1875 births
1952 deaths
Italian opera librettists
Writers from Verona
Italian journalists
Italian male journalists
Italian dramatists and playwrights
Italian theatre critics
Italian male dramatists and playwrights